Jack is a given name, a diminutive of John or Jackson; alternatively, it may be derived from Jacques, the French form of James or Jacob. Since the late 20th century, Jack has become one of the most common names for boys in many English-speaking countries. Jack is also used to a lesser extent as a female given name, often as a shortened version of Jacqueline.

The word "jack" is also commonly used in other contexts in English for many occupations, objects and actions, linked to the use of the word as a metaphor for a common man.

Origin

Jack is thought by some to have hailed from the earlier Jackin (from the name Jankin). Alternatively, it may be derived from an  anglicisation of Jacques, the French form of the name James or Jacob. There is also a theory that it is Celtic in origin, meaning "healthy, strong, full of vital energy" (compare the Welsh word iach, "health"), from a putative Ancient British Yakkios. Both the name and the word "jack" were long used as a term to refer to any man, especially of the common classes.

Frequency
In several English-speaking countries, Jack has become increasingly used as a formal name, rather than being a mere nickname as it traditionally has been. In its own right, it is now more popular than John, James, and Jacob. In recent years, Jack has been the most common given name for boys in the United Kingdom, Ireland, and Australia, and has grown in popularity in the United States.

John–from which Jack was often derived—was, along with William, the most frequent male name throughout the 19th century and in the first half of the 20th century. Jack appeared on the lists of the most frequently used male-baby names in the UK for 2003–2007.

In 2014, Jack was again the most popular name for baby boys in Ireland.

In 2008, 2009, 2010, and 2013, Jack was the most common name given to boys in Australia.

According to the United States Census of 1990, Jack is an uncommon American name, the given name for 0.315% of the male population and 0.001% of the female population.  However, the frequency of Jack as a baby name has steadily increased from the 160–170 rank prior to 1991 to a rank of 35 in 2006.

Jock is a common diminutive of the name John in Scotland.

Other uses in English
The name Jack is unusual in the English language for its frequent use as a noun or verb for many common objects and actions, and in many compound words and phrases.

Examples include implements, such as a car jack, knucklebones (the game jacks), or the jack in bowls.

The word is also used in other words and phrases such as: apple jack, hijack, jack of clubs (playing card), jack straw (scarecrow), jack tar (sailor), jack-in-the-box, jack-of-all-trades, Jack the lad, jack o'lantern, jackdaw, jackhammer, jackknife, jackpot, lumberjack, Union Jack, etc.

The history of the word is linked to the name being used as a by-name for a man.

People with the given name
 Jack I. Abecassis, American scholar
 Jack Abel (1927–1996), American comic book artist
 Jack Abramoff (born 1959), American former lobbyist, businessman, movie producer, and writer, convicted of corruption
 Jack Adams (disambiguation), multiple people
 Jack Agazarian (1915–1945), British spy
 Jack Agüeros (1934–2014), author, playwright, poet and translator
 Jack Aker (born 1940), American former Major League Baseball pitcher
 Jack Albertson (1907–1981), American actor
 Jack Anderson (disambiguation), multiple people
 Jack Angel (1930–2021), American actor
 Jack Arute (born 1950), American former sportscaster
 Jack Asher (1916–1991), English cinematographer
 Jack Avery (murder victim) (1911–1940), British War Reserve Constable
 Jack Avery (singer) (born 1999), American singer in the boy band Why Don't We
 Jack Babuscio (1937–1990), American journalist
 Jack Barakat (born 1988), lead guitarist for punk rock band All Time Low
 Jack Baker (born 1942), one half of the first same-sex couple to be married legally with a license that was never revoked
 Jack Benny (1894–1974), American comedian, vaudevillian, actor, and violinist
 Jack Black (born 1969), American actor
 Jack Blott (1902–1964), All-American football center and place kicker
 Jack Brabham (1926–2014), Australian racing driver
 Jack Brickhouse (1916–1998), American sportscaster
 Jack Brisco (1941–2010), American professional wrestler
 Jack Bruce (1943–2014), Scottish musician, composer, and vocalist
 Jack Buck (1924–2002), American sportscaster
 Jack Burtch (1926–2015), American lawyer
 Jack Cade (c. 1420–1450), the leader of a popular revolt against the government of England in 1450
 Jack Campbell (born 1992), American ice hockey goaltender
 Jack Bridger Chalker (1918–2014), British artist and teacher
 Jack L. Chalker (1944–2005), American science fiction author
 Jack Charlton (1935–2020), English footballer and manager
 Jack Chesbro (1874–1931), American Major League Baseball pitcher
 Jack T. Chick (1924–2016), American publisher, writer, and comic book artist of evangelical fundamentalist Christian tracts and comic books
 Jack Cichy (born 1996), American footballer
 Jack Cirilo (born 1999), Peruvian footballer
 Jack Clarke (Australian footballer) (1933–2001), Australian rules footballer and coach in the VFL
 Jack Clement (1931–2013), American singer-songwriter, record producer
 Jack Cock (1893–1966), English footballer
 Jack Colman, British author
 Jack E. Conger (1921–2006), American Marine flying ace during World War II
 Jack Kent Cooke (1912–1997), Canadian entrepreneur
 Jack Coombs (1882–1957), Major League Baseball pitcher
 Jack Cork (born 1989), English footballer
 Jack Crawford (disambiguation), multiple people
 Jack Crisp (born 1993), Australian rules footballer
 Jack Cronin (1874–1929), American Major League Baseball pitcher
 Jack Cronin (American football) (1903–1993), American footballer
 Jack Crook (born 1993), English basketball player
 Jack Cust (born 1979), American former baseball player
 Jack Daly (politician) (1915–1988), Irish politician
 Jack Daniels (disambiguation), multiple people
 Jack Dann (born 1945), American writer
 Jack Dee (born 1961), English stand-up comedian, actor, and writer
 Jack DeJohnette (born 1942), American jazz drummer, pianist, and composer
 Jack Del Rio (born 1963), American football coach
 Jack Dempsey (disambiguation), multiple people
 Jack Dickin (1899–1966), British Olympic swimmer
 Jack Diment (died 1978), Scottish footballer
 Jack Doan (born 1972) American professional wrestling referee
 Jack Dorsey (born 1976), American technology entrepreneur, co-founder and CEO of Twitter
 Jack Douglass (born 1988), American YouTube comedian of "jacksfilms" fame
 Jack Driscoll (American football) (born 1997), American footballer
 Jack Dromey (1948–2022), British Labour Party politician and trade unionist
 Jack Dugger (1923–1988), American footballer
 Jack Dugnolle (1914–1977), English footballer
 Jack Easterby (born 1982 or 1983), American football executive
 Jack Dyer (1913–2003), Australian rules footballer and coach, broadcaster and journalist
 Jack Eichel (born 1996), American National Hockey League player
 Jack Eisner (born 1947), Israeli basketball player
 Jack Elam (1920–2003), American actor
 Jack Elder (politician) (born 1949), New Zealand former politician
 Jack Ellena (1931–2012), American footballer
 Jack Elway (1931–2001), American footballer and head coach
 Jack Ely (1943–2015), American guitarist and singer
 Jack Endino (born 1964), producer and musician based in Seattle
 Jack Evans (disambiguation), multiple people
 Jack Faber (1903–1994), American microbiologist and college football and lacrosse coach
 Jack Falahee (born 1989), American actor
 Jack Fellure (1931–2022), American perennial political candidate and retired engineer
 Jack Fettes (born 2005), British basketball player
 Jack Fingleton (1908–1981), Australian cricketer
 Jack Finney (1911–1995), American author
 Jack Flagerman (1922–2005), American footballer
 Jack Flaherty (disambiguation), multiple people
 Jack Fleck (1921–2014), American professional golfer
 Jack Foley (disambiguation), multiple people
 Jack Fox (disambiguation), multiple people
 Jack Fultz (born 1948), American retired long-distance runner
 Jack Gamble, British footballer
 Joaquín "Jack" García (born 1952), Cuban-American FBI agent
 Jack Garfinkel (1918–2013), American basketball player
 Jack Givens (born 1956), American retired collegiate and professional basketball player
 Jack Glasscock (1857–1947), American Major League Baseball player
 Jack Gilinsky (born 1996), member of the American pop-rap duo Jack & Jack
 Jack Gingrass (1921–2010), American politician
 Jack Gold (1930–2015), British film and television director
 Jack Goody (1919–2015), British social anthropologist
 Jack Gotta (1929–2013), American-born Canadian professional footballer, coach, and general manager
 Jack Gore (actor) (born 2005), American actor
 Jack Graf (1919–2009), American football and basketball player
 Jack Graney (1886–1978), Canadian Major League Baseball player
 Jack Grant (disambiguation), multiple people
 Jack Dylan Grazer (born 2003), American actor
 Jack Grealish (born 1995), English footballer
 Jack Greenwell (1884–1942), English footballer and manager
 Jack Griffo (born 1996), American actor
 Jack Haden (1914–1996), American footballer
 Jack Hale (disambiguation), multiple people
 Jack Haley (disambiguation), multiple people
 Jack Halliday (American football) (1928–2000), American footballer
 Jack Ham (born 1948), former American football linebacker
 Jack Hand (1912–1995), American sports reporter
 Jack Hanna (born 1947), American zookeeper
 Jack Hannah (1913–1994), American animator, writer, and director of animated shorts
 Jack Heflin (born 1998), American footballer
 Jack Heinemann, New Zealand academic
 Jack Hennig (born 1946), Canadian singer-songwriter
 Jack Harper (disambiguation), multiple people
 Jack Herer (1939–2010), American cannabis activist
 Jack Hill (disambiguation), multiple people
 Jack Hirsch (born 1941 or 1942), American basketball player and coach
 Jack Hirsh (born c. 1941), Canadian clinician and scientist
 Jack Hobbs (1882–1963), English cricketer
 Jack Hoffman (American football) (1930–2001), American footballer
 Jack Holt (disambiguation), multiple people
 Jack Hopkins, English footballer
 Jack Hughes (disambiguation), multiple people
 Jack Huston (born 1982), English actor
 Jack Hyles (1926–2001), figure in the American Independent Baptist movement
 Jack Iddon (1902–1946), English cricketer
 Jack Ikin (1918–1984), English cricketer
 Jack Ingram (disambiguation), multiple people
 Jack Iroga (born 1986), sprinter from the Solomon Islands
 Jack Irons (born 1962), American musician
 Jack Iverson (1915–1973), Australian cricketer
 Jack Jacobs (disambiguation), multiple people
 Jack Jewsbury (born 1981), American soccer player
 Jack Johnson (disambiguation), multiple people
 Jack Jones (disambiguation), multiple people
 Jack Kamen (1920–2008), American illustrator
 Jack Katz (businessman) (born c. 1943), American businessman
 Jack Keane (born 1943), retired four-star general, former Vice Chief of Staff of the United States Army, and defense analyst
 Jack D. Keene (born 1947), American professor
 Jack Kemp (1935–2009), American politician and collegiate and professional footballer
 John F. Kennedy (1917–1963), American president, often called "Jack"
 Jack Kerouac (1922–1969), American novelist
 Jack Ketch (died 1686), English executioner employed by King Charles II
 Jack Kevorkian (1928–2011), American doctor
 Jack Kilby (1923–2005), American electrical engineer
 Jack Kirby (disambiguation), multiple people
 Jack Klugman (1922–2012), American actor
 Jack Kornfield (born 1945), American author and teacher in the vipassana movement in American Theravada Buddhism
 Jack Kotelawala (1910–1992), Sri Lankan Ambassador to the Soviet Union from 1969-1970
 Jack Kruger (born 1994), American professional baseball player
 Jack Ladyman (born 1947), American politician
 Jack Lambert (disambiguation), multiple people
 Jack Larsen (born 1995), American baseball player
 Jack Larson (1928–2015), American actor
 Jack Layton (1950–2011), Canadian politician
 Jack Lea (born 1994), rugby player
 Jack Leathersich (born 1990), American baseball player
 Jack Le Brocq (born 1992), Australian racing driver
 Jack Lemmon (1925–2001), American actor
 Jack Lew (born 1955), American government administrator, attorney, and 76th United States Secretary of the Treasury
 Jack Leyfield (1923–2014), English footballer
 Jack Lindsay (1900–1990), Australian-born British writer and poet
 Jack Lindsay (footballer) (1921–2006), Scottish footballer
 Jack Loach (born 1942), British businessman
 Jack London (disambiguation), multiple people
 Jack Lord (1920–1998), American actor
 Jack Lowden (born 1990), Scottish actor
 Jack Lynch (disambiguation), multiple people
 Jack Ma (born 1964), Chinese entrepreneur and philanthropist
 Jack Mack (1881–1960), Australian rules footballer
 Jack Mara (1908–1965), co-owner of the New York Giants football franchise
 Jack Markell (born 1960), American politician
 Jack Marsh (–1916), Australian first-class cricketer
 Jack Mayfield (born 1990), American baseball player
 Jack McBrayer (born 1973), American comedic actor
 Jack McCall (1852/1853–1877), murderer of Old West legend Wild Bill Hickok
 Jack McConnell (born 1960), Scottish politician, First Minister of Scotland 2001–2007
 Jack McCracken (1912–1958), American basketball player in the 1930s and 1940s
 Jack McFetridge (1869-1917), Major League Baseball pitcher
 Jack McKinney (basketball) (1935–2018), American basketball coach
 Jack McKinney (writer), pseudonym used by American authors James Luceno and Brian Daley
 Jack McVite (1932–1967), British criminal
 Jack Meanwell (1919–2005), Canadian artist and art teacher
 Jack Merriott (1901–1968), English writer and artist
 Jack Moehle, American academic
 Jack Moore (disambiguation), multiple people
 Jack Morelli (born 1962), American comic book letterer
 Jack Morris (born 1955), American former Major League Baseball pitcher
 Jack Maumbe Mukhwana (1939–2017), Ugandan politician
 Jack Nance (1943–1996), American actor
 Jack Narz (1922–2008), American television announcer and game show host
 Jack Nasher (born 1979), German business psychologist, author, and professor
 Jack Neo (born 1960), Singaporean film and television actor, host, and director
 Jack Nevin, American lawyer
 Jack Newman (disambiguation), multiple people
 Jack Nicholson (born 1937), American actor
 Jack Nicklaus (born 1940), American golfer
 Jack Nitzsche (1937–2000), American musician, arranger, producer, songwriter, and film score composer
 Jack Novak (born 1953), American former professional footballer
 Jack Null (1924–2003), American college basketball coach
 Jack Oakie (1903–1978), American actor
 Jack O'Connell (disambiguation), multiple people
 Jack Ohman (born 1960), American editorial cartoonist
 Jack Okey (1889–1963), American art director
 Jack Oleck (1914–1981), American novelist and comic book writer
 Jack Olsen (1925–2002), American journalist and author
 Jack O'Neill (disambiguation), multiple people
 Jack Osbourne (born 1985), English media personality
 Jack O'Shea (born 1957), Irish former Gaelic footballer
 Jack Owen (disambiguation), multiple people
 Jack Oyugi, Kenyan entrepreneur
 Jack Paar (1918–2004), American author, comedian, and talk show host
 Jack Palance (1919–2006), American actor
 Jack Pardee (1936–2013), American National Football League player and head coach
 Jack Parsons (disambiguation), multiple people
 Jack Patera (1933–2018), American former footballer and coach in the National Football League
 Jack Paterson (born 1974), Canadian director, devisor, dramaturg, translator, actor
 Jack Paton (1881–1935), Scottish cricketer
 Jack Peart (1888–1948), English footballer
 Jack Pickersgill (1905–1997), Canadian civil servant and politician
 Jack M. Poorbaugh (1919–1987), American politician
 Jack Powell (disambiguation), multiple people
 Jack Joseph Puig, American music engineer and producer
 Jack Pyle (1909–1987), American stage magician
 Jack Quaid (born 1992), American actor
 Jack Quinlan (1927–1965), American sportscaster
 Jack Quinn (disambiguation), multiple people
 Jack N. Rakove (born 1947), American historian, author, professor, and Pulitzer Prize winner
 Jack Ralite (1928–2017), French politician
 Jack Rampton (1920–1994), British civil servant
 Jack Ramsay (1925–2014), American basketball coach
 Jack Reed (disambiguation), multiple people
 Jack Regan (disambiguation), multiple people
 Jack Rieley (1942–2015), American record producer
 Jack Riewoldt (born 1988), Australian rules footballer
 Jack River (born Holly Rankin, 1991), Australian singer-songwriter
 Jack Rosenthal (1931–2004), English playwright
 Jack Roush (born 1942), American founder, CEO, and co-owner of Roush Fenway Racing
 Jack Ruby (1911–1967), American nightclub operator who killed Lee Harvey Oswald
 Jack Russell (disambiguation), multiple people
 Jack Sack (1902–1980), American footballer and coach
 Jack Saul, South African-Israeli tennis player
 Jack Sawyer (born 2002), American footballer
 Jack Shepherd (disambiguation), multiple people
 Jack Shirai (died 1937), Japanese-American activist, trade unionist, and soldier
 Jack Shonkoff, American pediatrician
 Jack Sikma (born 1955), American National Basketball Association center
 Jack Snelling (born 1972), Australian politician
 Jack Sock (born 1992), American tennis player
 Jack Soren, pen name of Martin Richard Soderstrom, Canadian writer
 Jack Souther (1924–2014), American-Canadian geologist
 Jack Stauber (born 1996), American musician, YouTuber and animator
 Jack Steinberger (1921–2020), American physicist
 Jack Stoll (born 1998), American footballer
 Jack Straw (born 1946), British politician
 Jack Suwinski (born 1998), American baseball player
 Jack Swagger (born 1982), American wrestler
 Jack Sweeney, American programmer and entrepreneur
 Jack Swift (born 1985), Australian paratriathlete
 Jack Talty, Irish musician
 Jack Tatum (1948–2010), American National Football League player
 Jack Taylor (born 1990), American basketball player
 Jack Thrasher (1938–2017), American immunotoxicologist
 Jack Tighe (1913–2002), American Major League Baseball head coach
 Jack Titus (1908–1978), Australian rules footballer
 Jack Tocho (born 1995), American footballer
 Jack Townend (1918–2005), British illistrator and graphic artist
 Jack Trice (1902–1923), American footballer
 Jack Troy (1928–1995), Australian rugby league footballer
 Jack Twyman (1934–2012), American basketball player and sports broadcaster
 Jack Ulrich (1890–1927), Canadian ice hockey player
 Jack Underman (1925–1969), American basketball player
 Jack Underwood (1894–1936), American footballer
 Jack Unruh (1935–2016), American commercial illustrator
 Jack Unterweger (1950–1994), Austrian serial killer
 Jack Urban (1928–2006), former Major League Baseball pitcher
 Jack Vale (disambiguation), multiple people
 Jack Valenti (1921–2007), American political advisor and lobbyist, president of the Motion Picture Association of America
 Jack Van Berg (1936–2017), American Hall-of-Fame horse trainer
 Jack Van Impe (1931–2020), American televangelist
 Jack Vance (1916–2013), American science fiction, fantasy, and mystery writer
 Jack Veal (born 2007), British child actor
 Jack Vettriano (born 1951), Scottish painter
 Jack Victory (born 1964), American professional wrestler and manager
 Jack Vidgen (born 1997), Australian singer
 Jack Viney (born 1994), Australian rules footballer
 Jack Voigt (born 1966), Major League Baseball outfielder
 Jack Vosti (1903–1977), Australian rules footballer
 Jack Waite (born 1969), American former tennis player
 Jack Warner (disambiguation)
 Jack Webb (1920–1982), American actor, television producer, director, and screenwriter
 Jack Welch (disambiguation)
 Jack White (disambiguation)
 Jack Whitehall (born 1988), English comedian, presenter, actor, and writer
 Jack Wild (1952–2006), English actor
 Jack Wilkie-Jans, Aboriginal affairs advocate
 Jack Williamson (1908–2006), American science fiction writer
 Jack Wilshere (born 1992), English footballer
 Jack Wilson (1937–1997), Irish novelist
 Jack Witikka (1916–2002), Finnish film director
 Jack Arthur Wood Jr. (1923–2005), American state senator of Idaho
 Jack Woodbridge (born 1956), American pianist, singer and composer
 Jack Liangjie Xu, former Co-President and Chief Technology Officer of SINA Corporation
 Jack Yan (born 1972), New Zealand publisher, designer, and businessman
 Jack Yang, American computer scientist and biophysicist
 Jack Yarber (born 1967), American singer, songwriter, and guitarist
 Jack Yeandle (born 1989), English rugby union player
 Jack Yellen (1892–1991), American lyricist and screenwriter
 Jack Yerman (born 1939), American former sprinter
 Jack Yost (born 1945), American politician
 Jack Youngblood (born 1950), American former college and professional footballer
 Jack Youngerman (1926–2020), American artist
 Jack Zajac (born 1929), American artist
 Jack Zduriencik (born 1951), Major League Baseball general manager
 Jack Zelig (1888–1912), American gangster
 Jack Zeller (1883–1969), American baseball executive
 Jack Zhao (born 1969), Chinese contract bridge player
 Jack Ziebell (born 1991), Australian rules footballer
 Jack Zilly (1921–2009), American footballer
 Jack Zipes (born 1937), American retired professor of German
 Jack Zouhary (born 1951), American federal judge
 Jack Zunz (1923–2018), British civil engineer, former chairman of Ove Arup & Partners

Fictional characters

Folklore and nursery rhymes
Jack Frost, bringer of winter
Jack (hero), an archetypal English hero of such fairy tales as "Jack and the Beanstalk"
Characters in English nursery rhymes and proverbs, including:
"Jack and Jill"
"Jack Be Nimble"
"Jack Spratt"
"Little Jack Horner"

Films and novels
Jack Aubrey, an officer in the Royal Navy of the Napoleonic Wars, one of the two main characters in the Aubrey–Maturin series by Patrick O'Brian
Jack Burton, from the film Big Trouble in Little China
Jack Butler, the main character played by Michael Keaton in the 1983 American comedy movie Mr. Mom
Jack Crawford, in the Hannibal Lecter book series and several adaptations
Jack Frost, from the 1997 horror film Jack Frost
Jack Frost, from the 1998 film Jack Frost starring Michael Keaton
Jack Napier, of the main characters in the 1989 movie Batman
Jack Reacher, protagonist in a series of novels by Lee Child
Jack Ryan, in Tom Clancy books and film adaptations
Jack Skellington, from the film The Nightmare Before Christmas
Jack Sparrow, protagonist of the Pirates of the Caribbean films
Jack Torrance, from the 1977 novel The Shining and its film adaptation from 1980
Jack West Jr, protagonist in a series of novels written by Matthew Reilly

Television
Jack Abbott, in the CBS soap opera The Young and the Restless
Jack Bauer, main character in the American TV series 24
Jack Branning, in the British soap opera EastEnders
Jack Carter (Eureka), in the American TV series Eureka
Jack Donaghy, in the American TV series 30 Rock
Jack Duckworth, in the British soap opera Coronation Street
Jack Fenton, in the American animated TV series Danny Phantom
Jack Geller, recurring character in the American TV show Friends
Father Jack Hackett, in the British TV series Father Ted
Jack Harkness, main character in the British TV series Torchwood and a recurring character in Doctor Who
Jack Hodgins, in the American TV series Bones
Jack Landors, in the American TV series Power Rangers SPD
Jack McFarland, in the American sitcom Will & Grace
Jack Michaelson, fictional character in the British soap opera, Brookside, played by actor Paul Duckworth
Jack O'Neill, main character in the Canadian-American TV series Stargate SG-1
Jack Osborne, in the British soap opera Hollyoaks
Jack Samuels, a corrupt detective in American TV series American Horror Story: Cult
Jack Shephard, main character in the American TV series Lost
Jack Spicer, villain in the American animated series Xiaolin Showdown
Jack Sugden, in the British soap opera Emmerdale
Jack Tripper, protagonist of the American sitcoms Three's Company and Three's a Crowd
Jack Pearson, main character in the American TV series This is Us
Jack the Front Loader, in the British TV series Thomas and Friends

Video games
Jack (Tekken), multiple characters from the Tekken series
Jack (Mass Effect), in the Mass Effect series
Handsome Jack, the main antagonist from Borderlands 2
Jack (BioShock), a.k.a. Jack Ryan, the silent protagonist of BioShock

Mascots
Jack Box, mascot of the American restaurant chain Jack in the Box
Jack the Bulldog, Georgetown University mascot

Other
Dr. Jack Bright, a character featured in several stories and articles produced for the collaborative fiction project SCP Foundation

See also
Jack (disambiguation)
Jacques
Jock (given name)
Old Jack (disambiguation), a list of people with the nickname and a few other items

References

English-language masculine given names
English-language feminine given names
English masculine given names
English feminine given names
English-language unisex given names
Dutch masculine given names
Dutch feminine given names
Irish masculine given names
Irish feminine given names
Hypocorisms